Stella Bloomberg Hackel Sims (born December 27, 1926) is an American attorney and politician who served as the 32nd director of the United States Mint from 1977 to 1981.

Early life and education
Sims was born Stella Bloomberg was born in 1926 in Burlington, Vermont. She was educated at the University of Vermont, graduating in 1945, and at the Boston University School of Law, receiving her Juris Doctor in 1948.

Career 
In 1957, she was elected grand juror (city court prosecutor) of Rutland, Vermont, holding that office until 1963. From 1963 to 1973, she was Commissioner of the Vermont Department of Employment Security. In 1971 and 1972, she was also president of the Interstate Conference of Employment Security Agencies.

She was the successful Democratic Party nominee for Vermont state treasurer in 1974 and served one term, 1975 to 1977. She was the Democratic nominee in the 1976 Vermont gubernatorial election, losing the general election to Richard A. Snelling. She was succeeded as treasurer by Emory A. Hebard and returned to Rutland as city attorney.

In 1977, President Jimmy Carter nominated Sims as director of the United States Mint, and she held the office from November 1977 to April 1981. In that capacity, she oversaw the creation of the Susan B. Anthony dollar in 1979. She attracted controversy from historians and numismatists alike when she ordered the destruction of Mint records in 1978.

Personal life 
In 1949, she married Donald H. Hackel (1925–1985). After her first husband died she married Dr. Arthur I. Sims and became known as Stella Hackel Sims. Arthur Sims died in 2006. Sims retired in 1988, settling in Arlington, Virginia and Naples, Florida.

References

|-

|-

1926 births
American prosecutors
Boston University School of Law alumni
Directors of the United States Mint
Living people
State treasurers of Vermont
University of Vermont alumni
Vermont Democrats
Vermont lawyers
Carter administration personnel
Reagan administration personnel